Cicognara is a surname. Notable people with the surname include:

Antonio Cicognara (1480–after 1500), Italian painter
Leopoldo Cicognara (1767–1834), Italian artist, art collector, art historian, and bibliophile

Italian-language surnames